The World Ecological Safety Assembly (WESA) is an international Conference which is held by International Ecological Safety Collaborative Organization (IESCO) every two years. The Presidium of WESA is the highest authority of IESCO.

Conferences  
 Year 2010 in Phnom Penh
 Year 2012 in Bali

References

External links 
Official website of the International Ecological Safety Collaborative Organization

Biennial events
Environmental conferences
Recurring events established in 2012